The Lone Ranger may refer to:

Aviation
 Striplin Lone Ranger, ultralight aircraft

Broadcasting and film 
 The Lone Ranger, the protagonist of an American media franchise of the same name
 The Lone Ranger (serial), a 1938 Republic film serial
 The Lone Ranger Rides Again, a 1939 Republic film serial
 The Lone Ranger (TV series), a 1949–1957 television series
 the nickname for actor Clayton Moore, who played the character in the series
 The Lone Ranger (1956 film), a feature film based upon the television and radio show
 The Lone Ranger and the Lost City of Gold, a 1958 feature film
 The Lone Ranger (1966 TV series), a Saturday morning cartoon series launched in 1966.
 The Tarzan/Lone Ranger Adventure Hour, a 1980s animated television series
 The Legend of the Lone Ranger, a 1981 feature film
 The Lone Ranger (2003 film), a television film that was an unsuccessful series pilot for The WB Television Network
 The Lone Ranger (2013 film), a feature film directed by Gore Verbinski

Music
 "The Lone Ranger", a 1976 song by British band Quantum Jump which reached UK No. 5 on its 1979 reissue
 Lone Ranger (musician), Jamaican reggae DJ who released nine albums between 1977 and 1985
 Lone Ranger (Jeff Watson album), a 1992 album by guitarist Jeff Watson
 The Lone Ranger (album), a 1995 album from British singer Suggs
 "The Lone Ranger", a 1996 song by George Jones from the album I Lived to Tell It All
 The Lone Ranger (soundtrack), a 2013 soundtrack from The Lone Ranger

Other media
 The Lone Ranger and Tonto Fistfight in Heaven, a 1993 collection of interconnected short stories
 The Lone Ranger (video game), a 1991 video game

People
 Bass Reeves (1838–1910), law enforcement officer colloquially referred to as the "real lone ranger"